Patricio Cucchi (born 5 March 1993) is an Argentine professional footballer who plays as a centre-forward for Instituto.

Career
Cucchi began his career with Rosario Central. In June 2014, Cucchi was loaned to Torneo Federal A's Tiro Federal. He scored twice in his opening five appearances, netting in matches with Libertad and Independiente in September. Upon returning to his parent club, Cucchi soon departed on loan once again by signing with Unión Mar del Plata of Primera B Nacional. His professional bow came on 26 April against Atlético Paraná, with eight more appearances occurring; though just one was a start. January 2016 saw Cucchi join Libertad on a permanent deal. Six goals in 16 encounters followed.

On 30 June 2016, Cucchi completed a move across Torneo Federal A by agreeing to sign for Gimnasia y Esgrima de Mendoza. He made his debut on 11 September versus Sportivo Desamparados, which was the first of 64 games in 2 seasons with the club which culminated with promotion to the second tier in 2017–18. He netted a brace on the opening day in 2018–19 against Temperley. A total of seventeen goals arrived that season in all competitions, with the forward subsequently announcing his intentions to depart at the conclusion of the campaign. A move to Colombia to play for Atlético Nacional was agreed on 28 June. In 2020, Cucchi was loaned out to Independiente Santa Fe for the rest of the year.

Personal life
In May 2019, Cucchi was involved in a minor traffic collision. An accident that forced him to miss subsequent training, though he and the other occupant escaped unharmed.

Career statistics
.

References

External links

1993 births
Living people
Sportspeople from Santa Fe Province
Argentine people of Italian descent
Argentine footballers
Association football forwards
Argentine expatriate footballers
Expatriate footballers in Colombia
Argentine expatriate sportspeople in Colombia
Torneo Federal A players
Primera Nacional players
Categoría Primera A players
Rosario Central footballers
Tiro Federal footballers
Unión de Mar del Plata footballers
Libertad de Sunchales footballers
Gimnasia y Esgrima de Mendoza footballers
Atlético Nacional footballers
Independiente Santa Fe footballers
Club Atlético Sarmiento footballers